Ciszewski (feminine: Ciszewska; plural: Ciszewscy) is a surname of Polish-language origin. It may refer to:
 Carola Ciszewski (born 1968), German handball player
 Józef Ciszewski (1904-1987), Polish footballer
 Maciej Ciszewski (born 1971), Polish fencer

Polish-language surnames